Gaspé was a federal electoral district in Quebec, Canada, that was represented in the House of Commons of Canada from 1867 to 1997.

It was created by the British North America Act, 1867. It was amalgamated into the Gaspé—Bonaventure—Îles-de-la-Madeleine electoral district in 1996.

Members of Parliament

This riding elected the following Members of Parliament:

Election results

See also 

 List of Canadian federal electoral districts
 Past Canadian electoral districts

External links
Riding history from the Library of Parliament

Former federal electoral districts of Quebec